Tampines East MRT station is an underground Mass Rapid Transit station on the Downtown line in Tampines, Singapore, located along Tampines Avenue 7, near the junction with Tampines Avenue 2. This station, like most of the other Downtown Line stations, also serves as a Civil Defence Shelter.

The station serves Tampines North Park, Tampines North and East residents and nearby schools such as East Spring Secondary School and Ngee Ann Secondary School.

History

Construction did not begin until late November 2011, where construction begun throughout the entire stretch of Tampines Avenue 7 from the junction of Tampines Street 42 to the junction of Tampines Avenue 7, 2 and 9. The road was realigned on 25 March 2012.

This station opened on 21 October 2017, as announced by the Land Transport Authority on 31 May that year.

References

External links

Railway stations in Singapore opened in 2017
Tampines
Mass Rapid Transit (Singapore) stations